The French Lick Plutos were an early independent Negro league baseball club, which was based in French Lick, Indiana, from 1912 to 1914. They were alternately known as the Red Devils.

Founding 

The Plutos were based in French Lick, Indiana, at the French Lick Springs Hotel and frequented the West Baden Springs Hotel in nearby West Baden Springs.

Their name derived from a bottled water produced at the Hotel.  The Hotel bordered on a local salt lick and mineral spring and the minerals from the spring made the water act as an effective and marketable natural laxative.  The product was branded as "Pluto Water" with an image of a red devil on the label.  Their frequent rivals, the West Baden Sprudels, came from a hotel on the same spring that had also bottled the water and sold it as "Sprudel Water".

Players 

Through their history, the Plutos roster included players as Todd Allen, Mule Armstrong, Bingo Bingham, Sam Crow, Dizzy Dismukes, Bingo DeMoss, Henry Hannon, Dan Kennard and Harry Moore, among others who later became members of the Negro National League.

Sources

Riley, James A (1994). The Biographical Encyclopedia of the Negro Baseball Leagues. Carroll & Graf. 

Negro league baseball teams
1912 establishments in Indiana
1914 disestablishments in Indiana
Baseball teams established in 1912
Baseball teams disestablished in 1914
Professional baseball teams in Indiana
Orange County, Indiana
Defunct baseball teams in Indiana